The Only is the third extended play by South Korean boy group The Boyz. It was released on November 29, 2018 through Cre.ker Entertainment. The EP consists of six tracks.

Background 
The Boyz released their third extended play The Only and its lead single "No Air" on November 29, 2018.

Track listing

Charts

Release history

References 

2018 EPs
The Boyz (South Korean band) EPs